Donnie Dumphy is a fictional character portrayed by Leon Parsons and created by Leon Parsons and Nik Sexton.

Sexton produced skateboard videos in St. John's, Newfoundland and Labrador and interspersed humorous skits of Donnie, in the role of a "skeet" (Newfoundland stereotype of a lower-class man) into the footage. After a positive reaction from friends and coworkers, he developed the Dumphy character with Parsons and began posting videos on YouTube, calling the music "gib rap".  Despite being an admitted "running joke", Sexton and Parson have produced a hip hop CD with the Donnie Dumphy persona and are actively working on a Dumphy film together.

Dumphy and his girlfriend Brenda hosted the 2009 Grand Falls-Windsor, NL Salmon Festival, featuring headliner Akon and some 20,000 people in attendance.

On August 21, 2009, Dumphy was featured on the Ron and Fez show on Sirius XM Radio, a satellite radio platform with over 20 million listeners.  Dumphy discussed life in Newfoundland, his relationship with his sometimes abusive girlfriend Brenda, and his increasing fame as his YouTube video "goes viral."

Dumphy also appears regularly on short comedy skits produced by The Outhouse.

Film
In 2014, Parsons and Sexton produced a feature-length film about the Dumphy character, entitled How To Be Deadly, following the 2012 success of a related 15-minute short film of the same title that screened at Cannes and the Toronto International Film Festival.

Discography

Albums
 I Loves Doin' Wheelies (2009)
 Lord of the B'ys (2015)

Singles
 Fresh Out (2020)
 Shea Heights Baby (2020) (Ice Ice Baby Parody)

Notes

Fictional rappers
Fictional Canadian people